Audiovisual education or multimedia-based education (MBE) is an instruction where particular attention is paid to the audiovisual or multimedia presentation of the material with the goal of improving comprehension and retention.

According to the Webster dictionary, audio-visual materials is defined as "training or educational materials directed at both the senses of hearing and the sense of sight, films, recordings, photographs, etc. used in classroom instructions, library collections or the likes".

History
The concept of audiovisual aids is not new and can be traced back to seventeenth century when John Amos Comenius (1592–1670), a Bohemian educator, introduced pictures as teaching aids in his book Orbis Sensualium Pictus ("picture of the Sensual World") that was illustrated with 150 drawings of everyday life. Similarly, Jean Rousseau (1712–1778) and JH Pestalozzi  (1746–1827) advocated the use of visual and play materials in teaching. More recently, audiovisual aids were also widely used during and after World War II by the armed service. The successful use of pictures and other visual aids in U.S armed forces during World War II proved the effectiveness of instructional tools.<ref></</ref> 
There are various types of audiovisual materials ranging from filmstrips, microforms, slides, projected opaque materials, tape recording and flashcards. In the current digital world, audiovisual aids have grown exponentially with several multimedia such as educational DVDs, PowerPoint, television educational series, YouTube, and other online materials. The goal of audio-visual aids is to enhance teacher's ability to present the lesson in simple, effective and easy to understand for the students. Audiovisual materials make learning more permanent since students use more than one sense. 
It is important to create awareness for the state and federal ministry of education as policy makers in secondary schools of the need to inculcate audiovisual resource as main teaching pedagogy in curricula. The outcome is to promote the audiovisual material in secondary schools because they lack the resource to produce them. The visual instruction makes abstract ideas more concrete for the learners. This is to provide a basis for schools to understand the important roles in encouraging and supporting the use of audiovisual resource. In addition, studies have shown that there is significant difference between the use and non-use of audiovisual material in teaching and learning.<ref></</ref>

Objectives 
To strengthen teachers' skills in making teaching-learning process more effective 
To attract and retain learners' attention
To generate interest across different levels of students
To develop lesson plans that are simple and easy to follow
To make class more interactive and interesting
To focus on student-centered approach

Advantages 
In modern world we use digital tools to improve the teaching-learning process. The most common tool we use in classroom these days is PowerPoint slides, which makes the class more interesting, dynamic and effective. Moreover it also helps to introduce new topics in easy way. The use of audiovisual aids makes the students to remember the concept for longer period of time. They convey the same meaning as words but it gives clear concepts thus help to bring effectiveness in learning.

Integrating technology into the classroom help students to experience things virtually or vicariously. For example, if the teacher wants to give a lesson on Taj Mahal, it is possible that not all the students in India have visited the place but you can show it through a video thereby allowing the students to see the monument with their own eyes. Although the first hand experience is the best way of educative experience but such an experience cannot always be done practical so in some case we need to have substitution.

Use of audio-visual aids help in maintaining discipline in the class since all the students' attention are focused in learning. This interactive session also develops critical thinking and reasoning that are important components of the teaching-learning process.<ref></</ref>

Audiovisual provides opportunities for effective communication between teacher and students in learning.  For example, in a study on English as Foreign Language (EFL) classroom, the difficulties faced by EFL learner are lack of motivation, lack of exposure to the target language and lack of pronunciation by teacher, and such difficulties can be overcome by Audio as purpose of communication and Visual as more exposure.

Students learn when they are motivated and curious about something. Traditional verbal instructions can be boring and painful for students. However, use of audio-visual provides intrinsic motivation to students by peaking their curiosity and stimulating their interests in the subjects.

Disadvantages
One should have an idea that too much of audio-visual material used at one time can result in boredom. It is useful only if it is implemented effectively. Considering that each teaching/learning situation varies, it is important to know that all concepts may not be learned effectively through audiovisual.  Most of the time the equipment like projector, speakers and headphone are bit costly hence some of the schools cannot afford it. It needs a lot of time for teacher to prepare lesson to have interactive classroom session. Also teacher's valuable time may be lost in gaining familiarity with new equipment. Some students may feel reluctant to ask questions while film is playing and in small rooms can be a physical barrier. In places where electricity is not available i.e. in rural areas, it is not feasible to use audio-visual aids that requires electricity.

Conclusion 
It is clear that audio visual aids are important tools for teaching learning process. It helps the teacher to present the lesson effectively and students learn and retain the concepts better and for longer duration. Use of audio visual aids improves student's critical and analytical thinking. It helps to remove abstract concepts through visual presentation. However, improper and unplanned use of these aids can have negative effect on the learning outcome. Therefore, teachers should be well trained through in-service training to maximize the benefits of using these aids. The curriculum should be designed such that there are options to activity based learning through audio-visual aids. In addition, government should fund resources to purchase audio-visual aids in schools.

Equipment used for audiovisual presentations

Television
LCD projectors
Film projectors
Slide projectors
Opaque projectors (episcopes and epidiascopes)
Overhead projectors

References

Pedagogy
Multimedia